Monumenta Historica Britannica (MHB); or, Materials for the History of Britain, From the Earliest Period, is an incomplete work by Henry Petrie, the Keeper of the Records of the Tower of London, assisted by John Sharpe.  Only the first volume covering material prior to the Norman Conquest was printed in 1848 by G. E. Eyre & W. Spottiswoode for Her Majesty.  It was reprinted by Gregg Publishing in March 1971.

Petrie drafted the proposal to include all the references to Britain in the Greek and Roman writers, as well as general histories and annals.
In 1823 the Record Commission, predecessor to the Public Record Office, gave the task to Henry Petrie.  The work was suspended in 1835 by order of the commissioners, after Petrie had prepared the first volume and had started work on the second, "due to a misunderstanding between them and Petrie."  Petrie died in 1842.  The first volume was posthumously published by Sir Thomas Duffus Hardy, Petrie's successor.

Volume I. Extending To The Norman Conquest
 Preface by Thomas Duffus Hardy
It contains chronicles, or parts thereof, to 1066:
 Æthelweard's Chronicon
 Anglo-Saxon Chronicle
 Annales Cambriae
 Asser
 Bede
 Brut y Tywysogion
 Chronologia brevissima
 Florence of Worcester
 Genealogia regum
 Geoffrey Gaimar
 Gildas
 Guy of Amiens
 Henry of Huntington
 Nennius
 Simeon of Durham
 An account of British and Roman coins by John Doubleday, with 17 full page plates of coins
 Folding map by W. Hughes
 Speeches of Boadicea to her soldiers as reported by the Roman historian, Dio Cassius (epitome of John Xiphilinus)
 Bibliography of over a hundred classical authorities from about 100 A.D. onwards that mention Britain.

References

History books about the United Kingdom